The Daily & Sunday Jeffersonian is a daily newspaper published in Cambridge, Ohio, United States, serving Cambridge and the surrounding communities of Guernsey County.

The Daily Jeffersonian was established in 1892. It has a daily circulation of about 11,000 and a Sunday circulation of about 12,000. The newspaper is owned and by GateHouse Media based in Perinton, New York, who acquired it in February 2017.

References

External links

Gannett publications
Guernsey County, Ohio
Newspapers published in Ohio
1892 establishments in Ohio